Saptagram Assembly constituency is an assembly constituency in Hooghly district in the Indian state of West Bengal.

Overview
As per orders of the Delimitation Commission, No. 193 Saptagram Assembly constituency is composed of the following: Bansberia Municipality, Aknna, Amnan, Goswami Malipara, Harit and Mahanad gram panchayats of Polba Dadpur community development block, and Mogra II and Saptagram gram panchayats of Chinsurah Mogra community development block.

Saptagram Assembly constituency is part of No. 28 Hooghly (Lok Sabha constituency).

Members of Legislative Assembly

Election results

2021

2016

2011

  

 

 
 

 

.# Swing calculated on Trinamool Congress vote percentages taken in 2006 in the now defunct Bansberia constituency.

References

Assembly constituencies of West Bengal
Politics of Hooghly district